Armen Petikyan (born 19 February 1972) is an Armenian football player. He has played for Armenia national team.

National team statistics

References

1972 births
Living people
Armenian footballers
Association football defenders
Armenia international footballers